Big Island is a census-designated place (CDP) in northern Bedford County, Virginia, United States. The population as of the 2020 United States census was 300. The CDP is located along the James River and U.S. Route 501, between Glasgow and Coleman Falls. It is part of the Lynchburg Metropolitan Statistical Area.

History
The area is named for a large, uninhabited island in the river upstream from the community.

Geography
According to the United States Census Bureau, the CDP has a total area of 0.830 square miles (2.15 km²).

Demographics

2020 census
As of the census of 2020, there were 300 people residing in the CDP. There were 153 housing units. The racial makeup of the CDP was 89.3% White, 6.3% African American or Black, 0.0% American Indian, 0.0% Asian, 0.0% Pacific Islander, 0.0% from other races, and 4.0% from two or more races. Hispanic or Latino of any race were 0.3% of the population.

2010 census
As of the census of 2010, there were 303 people residing in the CDP. There were 153 housing units. The racial makeup of the CDP was 95.4% White, 4.0% African American or Black, 0.3% American Indian, 0.0% Asian, 0.0% Pacific Islander, 0.0% from other races, and 0.3% from two or more races. Hispanic or Latino of any race were 0.3% of the population.

Economy
The community is centered around a Georgia-Pacific paper mill that has been in operation for more than 125 years and is considered one of the longest continuously producing paper mills in the United States.

Government
The United States Postal Service operates the Big Island Post Office within the CDP.

Fire protection is provided by the Big Island Volunteer Fire Company, which operates a fire station within the CDP. Emergency medical services are provided by the Bedford County Department of Fire and Rescue and Big Island Emergency Crew, which operate from a station within the CDP. Law enforcement is provided by the Bedford County Sheriff's Office, which uses the Big Island Emergency Crew station as a field office.

Education
The CDP is served by Bedford County Public Schools. Public school students residing in Big Island are zoned to attend Big Island Elementary School, Liberty Middle School, and Liberty High School.

The closest higher education institutions are located in Bedford and Lynchburg.

Infrastructure
The Bedford Hydropower Project and larger Cushaw Hydroelectric Project dams are located near Big Island and provide electricity to a portion of Bedford County, including the Town of Bedford.

Transportation

Airports
The Lynchburg Regional Airport is the closest airport with commercial service to the CDP.

Rail
The CSX operated James River Subdivision runs through the CDP. The closest passenger rail service is located in Lynchburg.

Roads
 U.S. Route 501
 Virginia State Route 122
 Blue Ridge Parkway

References

Census-designated places in Bedford County, Virginia
Populated places on the James River (Virginia)